Oktyabrsky Administrative District was a district (raion) of the city of Kaliningrad, Kaliningrad Oblast, Russia.

The Oktyabrsky Administrative District was formed on 25 July 1947. In accordance with the decision of the District Council of Deputies of the city of Kaliningrad dated 29 June 2009 No. 140, a reorganization was carried out: the Oktyabrsky Administrative District were merged into the Tsentralny Administrative District.

References

Former administrative units of Kaliningrad Oblast
States and territories established in 1947
States and territories established in 2009
1947 establishments in Russia
2009 disestablishments in Russia